The women's shot put event at the 2010 World Junior Championships in Athletics was held in Moncton, New Brunswick, Canada, at Moncton Stadium on 20 July.

Medalists

Results

Final
20 July

Qualifications
20 July

Group A

Group B

Participation
According to an unofficial count, 20 athletes from 15 countries participated in the event.

References

Shot put
Shot put at the World Athletics U20 Championships
2010 in women's athletics